The A13 class is a series of 9 container ships originally built for the United Arab Shipping Company (UASC) and now operated by Hapag-Lloyd. The ships have a maximum theoretical capacity of 13,296 TEU. The ships were built by Samsung Heavy Industries in South Korea.

List of ships

See also 

 A18-class container ship
 A15-class container ship

References 

Container ship classes
Ships built by Samsung Heavy Industries